"Economic Justice for All" is the pastoral letter promulgated by the United States Conference of Catholic Bishops in 1986. It deals with the U.S. economy and with Catholic social teaching in the U.S. context. It is a part of the tradition of Catholic social teaching.  The letter was written at a time when the Reagan administration was implementing libertarian policies of laissez-faire capitalism, and it may be interpreted as a reaction to what was seen as hostility towards the Catholic Church's teachings on social justice, subsidiarity, corporatism and distributism. 

Archbishop Rembert Weakland was asked to chair the U.S. bishops’ committee responsible for drafting the pastoral letter. He terms the experience “one of the most important and formative periods of my life”.

References

External links
 Link to the text of Economic Justice for All

Documents of the Catholic Social Teaching tradition
United States Conference of Catholic Bishops
1986 in Christianity
1986 documents
20th-century Catholicism